

Historical bridges 
This table contains a non-exhaustive list of bridges listed on the various heritage registers of Australia.

Bridges of architectural interest 
This table contains a non-exhaustive list of bridges of architectural interest, as determined by the Engineers Australia and/or other architectural organisations, as cited.

Major road and railway bridges 

Notes and references 
 Notes

 

 

 Other references

See also 

 Transport in Australia
 Rail transport in Australia
 Geography of Australia
 Historic bridges of New South Wales
 List of bridges in Sydney
 List of bridges in Brisbane
 List of bridges in Melbourne
 List of bridges in Perth, Western Australia
 List of bridges in Hobart
 Bridges over the Brisbane River
 List of crossings of the Murray River
 Crossings of the Yarra River

External links

Further reading